A total of sixty-four players have made their Australian Football League (AFL) debut in a senior AFL match to date during the 2010 AFL season.  In addition to those players making their AFL-level debuts, twenty-eight players have made their debuts following a trade or re-drafting are also listed below in a separate table.

A senior AFL match is an Australian rules football match between two clubs that are, or have been in the past, members of the AFL. A senior AFL match is played under the laws of Australian football, and includes regular season matches, as well as finals series matches. It does not include pre-season competition matches, interstate matches or international rules football matches. The list is arranged in the order in which each player made his debut for a club in a senior AFL match. Where more than one player made his debut in the same match, those players are listed alphabetically by surname.

AFL debuts
 Players are listed in order of debut, and statistics are for AFL regular season and finals series matches during the 2010 AFL season only. Players marked "(rookie)" are players who were elevated from their clubs' rookie-list to the senior list, and therefore were eligible to represent the club in a senior AFL match.

Change of clubs
 Players are listed in order of debut, and statistics are for AFL regular season and finals series matches during the 2010 AFL season only. Players are only included if they had previously played a senior AFL match with another club. "Previous club(s)" years are from the season of the player's debut for their respective club to the year in which they played their final game for that club.

References

Australian rules football records and statistics
Australian rules football-related lists
2010 in Australian rules football
2010 Australian Football League season